Samuel Lisle  (1683 – 3 October 1749) was an English academic and bishop.

Life

Lisle was born in Blandford, Dorset. He graduated M.A. at Wadham College, Oxford, in 1706,  and was ordained in 1707.

He was chaplain to the Levant Company from 1710 to 1719. On his return he advocated for a better Bible translation in Arabic. He was rector of Tooting in 1720. He became  Archdeacon of Canterbury in 1724 and Warden of Wadham College, Oxford, in 1739. He was also rector of St Mary-le-Bow, from 1721 to 1744; and rector of Northall, from 1729. He was Bishop of St Asaph, in 1744, and the bishop of Norwich, in 1748.

He died in London and was buried at St Mary the Virgin, Northolt, Middlesex.

Works

He collected inscriptions during his Levant chaplaincy, and they were printed in the Antiquitates Asiaticae of Edmund Chishull (1728).

Notes

1683 births
1749 deaths
People from Dorset
Bishops of Norwich
Bishops of St Asaph
Archdeacons of Canterbury
Fellows of the Royal Society
18th-century Church of England bishops
Wardens of Wadham College, Oxford
18th-century Welsh Anglican bishops